Flip and Spike is an album by American jazz guitarist Joe Morris released in 1992 on his own Riti label. It features a trio with Jerome Deupree, who was the original drummer in the rock band Morphine, and bassist Sebastian Steinberg.

Reception

In his review for AllMusic, Thom Jurek states "Flip & Spike is the first of Morris' recordings that articulate his signature investigations of the guitar as an instrument of sonic density and dexterity, not just as a solo vehicle. As such, and as a work of striking emotional commitment, it is quite remarkable."

In his book Honesty Is Explosive!: Selected Music Journalism, music writer Ben Watson claims about the album "Beneath the surface cool you sense a delirious funk. It creates a tension similar to the tumble-down-chaos-that-rocks in Beefheart."

Track listing
All compositions by Joe Morris.
 "Flip & Spike" – 7:44 
 "Itan" – 14:19
 "Julianna" – 2:42
 "Contemporarity" – 16:37
 "Mnemonic Device #1" – 0:52
 "Mnemonic Device #2" – 1:31
 "Mnemonic Device #3" – 1:13
 "Mnemonic Device #4" – 1:48
 "Mombaccus" – 11:31
 "Reflexes" – 10:38

Personnel
Joe Morris – guitar
 Sebastian Steinberg – acoustic bass
 Jerome Deupree – drums

References

1992 albums
Joe Morris (guitarist) albums